The Mt. Zion One Room School is a historic U.S. school until November 2015 located at Ironshire Street at intersection with Church Street, Snow Hill, Maryland when it was moved by the Worcester County Historical Society to the Furnace Town Living Heritage Museum located on Old Furnace Road off Route 12, 5 miles North of Snow Hill, Maryland.  The community used this one room school until 1931.

Mt. Zion One Room School Museum
The Mt. Zion One Room School Museum preserved how a school looked during the early 20th century by showcasing typical items found in a classroom during that period.

Notes

External links
Mt. Zion One-Room Schoolhouse (Ocean City Vacation and Hotels Guide website)

Education museums in the United States
History museums in Maryland
Museums in Worcester County, Maryland
One-room schoolhouses in Maryland
Schoolhouses in the United States
Defunct schools in Maryland